WMRT (88.3 FM) is a radio station broadcasting a classical music format. WMRT also plays jazz weekday afternoons.  Licensed to Marietta, Ohio, United States, it serves the Parkersburg-Marietta area.  The station is currently owned and by Marietta College and is run almost entirely by students.

External links

Marietta, Ohio
MRT
MRT